Sarabjeet "Gufi" Paintal (born 4 October 1944) is an Indian actor and director. His most famous role was that of Shakuni in the TV serial Mahabharat. He is the elder brother of the noted comedian and character actor Paintal.

Career 
Gufi Paintal is an Indian actor who appeared in some notable Bollywood movies in 1980s, as well as television serials and plays. He was born in a Sikh Family.

Initially trained as an engineer, he would go on to follow his younger brother (who had been trained at the Film and Television Institute of India) into acting. Arriving in Bombay in 1969 and Gufi took up modeling, worked as an assistant director for movies and acted in various movies and serials. He has also directed his brother. His most well-known role is that of Mama (Maternal Uncle) Shakuni in the Mahabharat adaptation by B.R. Chopra and his son Ravi Chopra which Paintal himself recognizes as his best role. Indeed, he is so associated with his Shakuni character in India that Paintal presented a political discussion show on the news channel Sahara Samay in the character of Shakuni.

Paintal has recently directed the movie, Shri Chaitanya Mahaprabhu which sketches the life of Chaitanya Mahaprabhu, a 16th-century devotee of Krishna who is recognised as an incarnation of the god by followers of Gaudiya Vaishnavism. The film was produced by Pawan Kumar with music by Ravindra Jain. In 2010 he was appointed head of facility at the Abbhinnay Acting Academy in Mumbai, a school established by his Mahabharata co-star Pankaj Dheer.

Filmography

Films

Television

References

External links
 
 Article about siblings in Indian television

Indian male film actors
Indian male television actors
Living people
1944 births